Stuart McNay (born August 1, 1981 in Boston, Massachusetts) is an American sailor, who specialized in two-person dinghy (470) class. He represented the United States, at four Olympics: two times partner Graham Biehl, in 2008 and 2012 and twice with partner Dave Hughes in 2016 and 2020.

Background
Stu learned to race at Beverly Yacht Club in Marion, Massachusetts. He was a multi time All-American in collegiate sailing at Yale University. He has raced for the US Sailing Team since 2003. As of September 2014, McNay/Biehl were ranked sixth in the world for two-person dinghy class by the International Sailing Federation, following their successes at the North American Championships and ISAF Sailing World Cup Series in Miami, Florida, United States.

Olympic sailing
At the 2008 Olympic Games, McNay/Biehl finished thirteenth, edging out Israel's Gideon Kliger and Udi Gal.

At the 2012 Summer Olympics in London, McNay competed for the second time as a helmsman in the men's 470 class by finishing thirteenth and receiving a berth from the ISAF World Championships in Perth, Western Australia. Teaming again with Biehl, they finished fourteenth-place finish in fleet of twenty-seven boats.

At the 2016 Olympic Games in Rio McNay and Hughes finished 4th in the men's 470 class, with McNay as helmsman.

At the 2020 Olympic Games in Tokyo McNay and Hughes finished 9th overall in the men's 470 class, with McNay as helmsman.

Other events
At the 2014 ISAF Sailing World Championships, McNay and his new partner David Hughes set a best career record with a fifth-place finish in the men's 470 class to secure their spot on the U.S. sailing team for the Olympics.

References

External links
 
 
 
 
 
 
 

1981 births
Living people
American male sailors (sport)
Olympic sailors of the United States
Sailors at the 2008 Summer Olympics – 470
Sailors at the 2012 Summer Olympics – 470
Sailors at the 2016 Summer Olympics – 470
Sailors at the 2020 Summer Olympics – 470
Sportspeople from Boston
Yale Bulldogs sailors
Melges 24 class world champions
505 class world champions
World champions in sailing for the United States